Elahi Bux Soomro or Illahi Bukhsh Soomro is from Shikarpur, Sindh, a Pakistani senior politician and legislator. He was the 16th Speaker of National Assembly of Pakistan. He belongs to an influential political family of Sindh. He has held several federal ministries, including portfolios of Ministry of Industries and Production, Ministry of Housing & Works, Ministry of Defence Production, Ministry of IT, Ministry of Science & Technology, Ministry of Information & Broadcasting, Ministry of Water and Power. He is one of few politicians who have been very close to Presidents and Prime Ministers of Islamic Republic of Pakistan. He has been a close and childhood friend of Zulfiqar Ali Bhutto, favourite of Zia-ul-Haq for the post of Prime Minister, the first minister appointed in the cabinet of and by Ghulam Mustafa Jatoi, Benazir Bhutto used to call him "Uncle", a very close aide to Nawaz Sharif and Ghulam Ishaq Khan, and before 2002 elections, the top army officials had announced his name for the premiership. He was a strong candidate for Prime Minister at numerous times in 1980s as well.

Civil Servant
He has remained Director General of Karachi Development Authority, Managing Director of S.I.T.E, Rector of Ghulam Ishaq Khan Institute of Engineering Sciences and Technology, NED University of Engineering and Technology and Jinnah Medical and Dental College, and above all he has made a record of becoming four times Chairman of Pakistan Engineering Council, each for three-year term. At present he is the Chancellor of the Institute of Business Management Karachi.

Nomination for premiership

He lost the 2002 election, and said the election was not fair.

See also
 Speaker of National Assembly
 National Assembly of Pakistan
 Politics of Pakistan

References

Forman Christian College alumni
Living people
NED University of Engineering & Technology alumni
People from Jacobabad District
Sindhi people
E
Speakers of the National Assembly of Pakistan
Academic staff of Ghulam Ishaq Khan Institute of Engineering Sciences and Technology
Year of birth missing (living people)